State assembly elections were held in Malaysia between  24 August and 14 September 1974 in all states except Sabah.

Results

Johore

Kedah

Kelantan

Malacca

Negri Sembilan

Pahang

Penang

Perak

Perlis

Sarawak

Selangor

Trengganu

References

State elections in Malaysia
state